This is a list of singles which have reached number one on the Irish Singles Chart in 1977.

24 Number Ones
Most weeks at No.1 (artist): ABBA (5)
Most weeks at No.1 (song): "Knowing Me, Knowing You" - ABBA (5)
Most No.1s: all artists 1 Number One each

See also
1977 in music
Irish Singles Chart
List of artists who reached number one in Ireland

1977 in Irish music
1977 record charts
1977